Greetings and Kisses, Veronika is a 1933 German comedy film directed by Carl Boese and starring Franciska Gaal, Paul Hörbiger, and Otto Wallburg. It was shot at the Johannisthal Studios in Berlin. The film's art direction was by Kurt Dürnhöfer and Max Heilbronner. The film's popularity made Gaal an international star. However the rise of the Nazi Party to power meant that the Jewish Gaal had to make her next films in Hungary and Austria.

Franz Waxman's song "Greetings and Kisses, Veronika" written for the film became a major hit and helped boost Waxman's career as a songwriter.

Cast
Franciska Gaal as Veronika
Paul Hörbiger as Paul Rainer
Otto Wallburg as Max Becker
Hilde Hildebrand as Klara Becker
Margarete Kupfer as Agathe Bolte
Kurt Lilien as Emil, Paul Rainers Diener
Olga Engl as Frau Zschoch
Ehmi Bessel as Anita
Erika Glässner as Frau Scharmeister
Arthur Bergen as Sanitätsrat Scharmeister
Mária Szepes

References

Bibliography 
 Klaus, Ulrich J. Deutsche Tonfilme: Jahrgang 1933. Klaus-Archiv, 1988.

External links

Films of the Weimar Republic
German comedy films
1933 comedy films
Films scored by Franz Waxman
Films directed by Carl Boese
German black-and-white films
1930s German films
1930s German-language films
Films shot at Johannisthal Studios